Adamantius is the academic journal of the Italian Research Group on Origen and the Alexandrian Tradition (GIROTA). It publishes research on Christian literature and Jewish-Hellenistic studies, with a focus on the Alexandrian scholar and theologian Origen (c.184 – c.253). Origen's nickname or cognomen Adamantios derives from Greek and means "adamant" or "unbreakable".

It was founded as the Bolletino del Gruppo Italiana di Ricerca su Origene e la Tradizione Alessandrina in 1996. GIROTA was formally founded in 2001 with Adamantius as its journal. The annual publication (21 issues to date) is divided into five sections: 
 monographical; 
 activities of the group; 
 bibliography relating to Origen and the Alexandrian Tradition; 
 news concerning conferences; and
 indices.

Several supplements have also been published. The director of the editorial board is Professor Alberto Camplani of the Sapienza University of Rome.  The journal is published in Italy by Editrice Morcelliana.

References

Annual journals
Journals about ancient Christianity